White Eyes (c.1730–1778) was a Native American leader and American Revolution figure.

White Eyes may also refer to:

White Eyes (album), by Magic, 2003
"White Eyes", a song by the Wombats from Beautiful People Will Ruin Your Life, 2018
White Eyes Creek, a stream in Ohio, US
White Eyes Township, Coshocton County, Ohio, US

See also
White-eye (disambiguation)